Barthélemy Charles Joseph Dumortier (3 April 1797 in Tournai – 9 July 1878) was a Belgian who conducted a parallel career of botanist and Member of Parliament.

Biography
Barthélemy Dumortier was a son of the merchant and city councillor Barthélemy-François Dumortier and of Mariue-Jeanne Willaumez. He married Philippine Ruteau and they had a son, Barthélemy-Noël Dumortier (1830-1915).

Barthélemy-Charles became politically active in the early eighteen twenties. In 1824 he founded the Courrier de l'Escaut, a paper critical of the government. He adhered in 1830 to the Belgian revolution.

In 1831 he became a member of the first elected parliament of the new kingdom, as the member for Tournai. He remained elected until 1847. He then switched seats, and was now elected for the city of Roulers and held this seat until his death.

In 1872 he was awarded the honorary title of Minister of State. He also was awarded nobility with the title of earl. However, for unknown reasons, he did not raise the necessary patent letters and was therefore not ennobled.

Botanist
In the early 1820s, Dumortier published in Latin his first contribution to botany. In 1827 he published a complete national flora, the Florula Belgica.
 
In 1829 Dumortier was already regarded as one of the greatest naturalists of the Low-Countries  and became a member of the Académie de Bruxelles. He not only studied botany but also zoology.

In 1835 Dumortier first proposed the genus Lepidozia. 
His reputation as a botanist was so brilliant that the Home Office asked him to be its representative in the Brussels’ Botanic Garden, then a joint stock company, supported by the State. In 1862, the Société Royale de Botanique de Belgique was created and Dumortier became its president.
 
When the company that ran the Brussels’ botanic garden collapsed, Dumortier developed the idea of a state-owned botanic garden in the capital. He succeeded in convincing the Parliament in 1869 of buying the impressive herbarium and dried collections of the late Carl Friedrich Philipp von Martius. A few months later the state bought the garden of the 'Société Royale d’Horticulture de Belgique'. Dumortier hoped to create a botanic garden whose role model was the Royal Kew Gardens.

His name was given to two plant species: to the Hemerocallis dumortieri (Hemerocallidoideae) and to the Stenocereus dumortieri (Cactaceae).

Also he was honoured in 1863, in the naming of Mortierella, which is species are soil fungi belonging to the order Mortierellales. Then in 1967, Aquamortierella is a fungal genus in the Mortierellaceae family of the Zygomycota.

Some consider him to be the true discoverer of cell division, although he is rarely credited as such.

Honours 

 1870 : Grand Cordon in Order of Leopold.

List of selected publications 

 
 
 Commentationes botanicae. Observations botaniques (imprimerie de C. Casterman-Dieu, Tournay, 1823).
 Observations sur les graminées de la flore de Belgique (J. Casterman aîné, Tournay, 1823).
 Lettres sur le manifeste du Roi et les griefs de la nation, par Belgicus (J. Casterman aîné, Tournay, 1830).
 Sylloge Jungermannidearum Europae indigenarum, earum genera et species systematice complectens (J. Casterman aîné, Tournay, 1830).
 Recherches sur la structure comparée et le développement des animaux et des végétaux (M. Hayez, Bruxelles, 1832).
 Essai carpographique présentant une nouvelle classification des fruits (M. Hayez, Bruxelles, 1835).
 La Belgique et les vingt-quatre articles (Société nationale, Bruxelles, 1838).
 Observations complémentaires sur le partage des dettes des Pays-Bas (Société nationale, Bruxelles, 1838).

Literature
 Oscar COOMANS DE BRACHENE, Etat présent de la noblesse belge, Annuaire 1988, Brussels, 1988.
 Jean-Luc DE PAEPE & Christiane RAINDORF-GERARD, Le Parlement belge, 1831-1894'', Brussels, 1996.

See also
 :Category:Taxa named by Barthélemy Charles Joseph Dumortier

References
IPNI Profile

 Dumortier on website of National Botanic Garden

External links
 Books by Dumortier at the Biodiversity library 

19th-century Belgian botanists
Bryologists
1797 births
1878 deaths
Belgian Ministers of State
Barons of Belgium
Politicians from Tournai